A Hanukkah film is a genre of film in which the main emphasis is on the celebration of the Jewish holiday of Hanukkah. Films in this style traditionally incorporate the religious aspects of Hanukkah, such as lighting the menorah and the story of the Maccabees, as well as the cultural aspects of Hanukkah, such as spinning dreidels, or eating traditional foods such as latkes, sufganiyot, or gelt. Films in this genre are typically similar to comedy and romantic comedy films in content, however some are similar in style to action, drama, and animated films, among other genres. Hanukkah films are more commonly produced in the United States, however, they are also produced in other countries such as Israel.

Hanukkah films have been compared to Christmas films, as the two holidays are celebrated during a similar time of year, and sometimes have similar storylines. The relative dearth of Hanukkah films, related to the thousands of Christmas films that have been produced, has been criticized, especially by those in the Jewish community, some of whom have asked for more films in this genre to be produced.

History

1986–2002 
Hanukkah has historically been more commonly portrayed in television, than in film, due to the relative lower financial risk and cost of production as compared to a feature film. One of the first films in this genre, was the 1986 American animated musical comedy drama adventure film, "An American Tail", which was directed by Don Bluth and went on to become the highest-grossing non-Disney animated film of its time. Though the film is not exclusively about Hanukkah, the holiday features prominently in its plot; as the opening scene of the film centers around the holiday.

2002–2018 

In 2002, the animated Hanukkah film, Eight Crazy Nights was released. The film was written and started by Adam Sandler, who also based the title of the film off the lyrics of his song, "The Chanukah Song". The film featured other notable actors such as Rob Schneider, Kevin Nealon, Jon Lovitz, and Jackie Titone (who is also Sandler's wife), and has been called the best known and highest profile Hanukkah film, and has been credited with starting the genre. The film was a box office bomb, grossing only $23.8 million of its $34 million budget; but gained a cult following among those in the Jewish community in the years following its release. The film has remained popular, however, some critics find the film abrasive and express the desire for "a better Hanukkah movie" to be made.

In 2012, the Hallmark Channel produced its first film mentioning Hanukkah, "Hitched for the Holidays", starring Joey Lawrence as an actor hired by a Jewish woman played by Emily Hampshire, (Hampshire is not actually Jewish herself), to pretend to be her boyfriend around her character's family, as they visit the "couple" for Hanukkah. Lawrence and Hampshire's characters later fall in love and marry in the end of the film.

2018–present 

In November 2018, Hallmark Channel announces their intention to produce two Hanukkah films titled, "Holiday Date", and "Double Holiday", respectively, on their television channel, which would air during their annual Countdown to Christmas event the following year. This was the first time the channel produced a Hanukkah film, and a spokeswoman for the channel said that the one film, Holiday Date, would have, "Hannukah elements... which is a lot of fun as Hanukkah and Christmas overlap in 2019." The other film's script, Holiday Date, was not finished at the time.

 Notable examples of Hanukkah films 
Some notable examples of films in this genre, as well as films featuring Hanukkah, are listed as follows.

 An American Tail An American Tail is a 1986 American animated musical comedy-drama adventure film directed by Don Bluth and produced by Sullivan Bluth Inc. and Amblin Entertainment. The film opens as the family is celebrating Hanukkah in Shostka, Ukraine in 1885, the Mousekewitzes, a Russian-Jewish family of mice who live with a human family named Moskowitz, are celebrating the holiday and Papa gives his hat to his 5-year-old son, Fievel, and tells him about the United States, a country where there are no cats. The celebration is interrupted when a battery of Cossacks ride through the village square in an anti-Jewish arson attack and their cats likewise attack the village mice. Because of this, the Moskowitz home, along with that of the Mousekewitzes, is destroyed, and the film tells the story of Fievel Mousekewitz and his family as they emigrate from the Imperial Russian territory of Ukraine to the United States for freedom. However, he gets lost and must find a way to reunite with them.

 Eight Crazy Nights Eight Crazy Nights is a 2002 American adult animated musical comedy-drama Hanukkah film directed by Seth Kearsley and produced, co-written by and starring Adam Sandler, in his first voice-acting role. The film is animated in the style of television holiday specials, and, unlike most mainstream holiday films, centers on Jewish characters during the Hanukkah season, as opposed to the Christian celebration of Christmas.

This is also Happy Madison Productions' first animated film. The film's title is taken from a line in Sandler's series of songs called "The Chanukah Song" that compares the gift-giving traditions of Christmas and Chanukah: "Instead of one day of presents, we get eight crazy nights!". Additionally, a new version of The Chanukah Song was played over the film's closing credits. It has been called the best known Hanukkah film.

The film has received a cult following, especially among those in the Jewish community, as it is one of the highest profile and most known Hanukkah films.

 The Hebrew Hammer The Hebrew Hammer is a 2003 American comedy Hanukkah film written and directed by Jonathan Kesselman. It stars Adam Goldberg, Judy Greer, Andy Dick, Mario Van Peebles, and Peter Coyote. The plot concerns a Jewish blaxploitation crime fighter known as the Hebrew Hammer who must save Hanukkah from the evil son of Santa Claus, who wants to destroy Hanukkah and Kwanzaa and make everyone celebrate Christmas.

 Full-Court Miracle Full-Court Miracle is a 2003 Disney Channel Original Hanukkah Movie. It premiered on November 21, 2003. Inspired by the true story of University of Virginia Cavaliers basketball star Lamont Carr, the film centers on a group of young Jewish basketball players during the Hanukkah season who are determined to find their own Judah Macabee to coach their team and help their team out of a slump. The main character Alex Schlotsky is inspired by the true story of Chad Korpeck and Alex Barbag. The film makes numerous references to the miracle of the oil, with the school's electricity staying on even though it was being powered by a gas generator with only enough fuel for one hour instead of the eight hours the game lasted. The film concludes with Rabbi Lewis (a fictional character in the film) telling the story of Hanukkah and its relation to the basketball game plays over the scene.

 Little Fockers Little Fockers (known as Meet the Parents: Little Fockers in the United Kingdom and Southeast Asia) is a 2010 American comedy film and the third and final film in the Meet the Parents film series, serving as a sequel to Meet the Parents (2000) and Meet the Fockers (2004). The film stars Robert De Niro, Ben Stiller, Owen Wilson, Blythe Danner, Teri Polo, Jessica Alba, Dustin Hoffman and Barbra Streisand. After the commercial success of the first two films in the franchise, both De Niro and Stiller received a remuneration of $20 million for their roles in Little Fockers. This was the first and only film in the series not to be directed by Jay Roach; it is instead directed by Paul Weitz with Roach as one of the producers. It is also the first film to not be distributed by DreamWorks Pictures in non-US countries, with Paramount Pictures taking over. Likewise, Stephen Trask, a relative newcomer, takes over composing duties from veteran Randy Newman. In addition to the original cast, Little Fockers features Jessica Alba, Laura Dern, Kevin Hart, and Harvey Keitel. Despite being critically panned, the film was a box office success, grossing over $310 million worldwide.

 Hitched For The Holidays Hitched for the Holidaysis a 2012 romantic comedy directed by Michael M. Scott and written by Gary Goldstein. After Rob Marino (played by Joey Lawrence) breaks up with his girlfriend in November, his Catholic family gives him grief since he never seems to have a significant other during the holidays. Meanwhile, Julie Green (played by Emily Hampshire) faces prodding questions from her Jewish mother about her relationships. After finding each other on a dating website, Rob and Julie agree to pretend to be each other's significant other at their Christmas and Hanukkah family gatherings to get their respective families off their backs but discover their charade may be a little too real.

 Switchmas Switchmas (earlier titles Ira Finkelstein's Christmas and All I Want Is Christmas) is a 2012 American musical comedy film directed by Sue Corcoran. It tells the story of a Christmas-obsessed Jewish boy on his way to sunny Florida to celebrate Hanukkah with his grandparents who figures out how to get the Christmas of his dreams by trading airline tickets and places with another boy on his way to snowy Christmastown, Washington. This film also features CGI scenes depicting the boy's Christmas dreams. It stars Elliott Gould and David DeLuise and is directed and produced by Sue Corcoran. It was originally filmed in Leavenworth, Washington, under the title Ira Finkelstein's Christmas. At a local screening in 2012 it had the title All I Want Is Christmas. The film was included in the 2012 Seattle International Film Festival.

 The Night Before The Night Before is a 2015 American Christmas comedy stoner film directed by Jonathan Levine and written by Levine, Evan Goldberg, Kyle Hunter and Ariel Shaffir. The film stars Joseph Gordon-Levitt, Seth Rogen and Anthony Mackie as three childhood friends who annually reunite on Christmas Eve in search of the best party in New York City. Lizzy Caplan, Jillian Bell, Mindy Kaling and Michael Shannon also star. Principal photography began on August 11, 2014, in New York City. Good Universe and Point Grey Pictures produced the film, which Columbia Pictures released on November 20, 2015. The film received positive reviews from critics and grossed $52 million worldwide. While this is definitively a Christmas film, while drunk and high Seth Rogan's character in a Hanukkah ugly sweater freaks out in a church during a Christmas service and at the Nutcracker Ball at situations that reference Jewish stereotypes.

 Call Me by Your Name Call Me by Your Name (Italian: Chiamami col tuo nome) is a 2017 coming-of-age romantic drama film directed by Luca Guadagnino. Its screenplay, by James Ivory, who also co-produced, is based on the 2007 eponymous novel by André Aciman. The film is the final installment in Guadagnino's thematic "Desire" trilogy, after I Am Love (2009), and A Bigger Splash (2015). Set in 1983 in northern Italy, Call Me by Your Name chronicles the romantic relationship between a 17-year-old, Elio Perlman (Timothée Chalamet), and Oliver (Armie Hammer), a 24-year-old graduate-student assistant to Elio's father Samuel (Michael Stuhlbarg), an archaeology professor. The two develop a rapport and bond over music, their shared Jewish identities, and their attraction to each other. What lands this romantic coming-of-age flick on this list is the film's epilogue. Months after the intense romance has blossomed and run its course, Elio receives a phone call from Oliver, where he announces to Elio's family that he has just gotten engaged. Still harboring passionate feelings for Oliver, Elio walks into the dining room and stares at the roaring fire in the fireplace as his parents set the table for their dinner on the last night of Hanukkah. The film also stars actresses Amira Casar, Esther Garrel, and Victoire Du Bois.

 Mistletoe & Menorahs Mistletoe & Menorahs is a 2019 romantic comedy directed by Max McGuire and written by Guy Yosub. The film's primary perspective is from an overly excitable Christmas-obsessed woman Kelley Jakle as Christy Dickinson fretting over being invited to a CEO's Hanukkah party (Jake Epstein as Jonathan Silver). She is so worried about this that she studies Hanukkah, stresses about it with her friends and family, and enlists the help of a co-worker's Jewish friend to learn about the holiday festivities.

 Hanukkah Hanukkah is a 2019 horror film written and directed by Eben McGarr. Father and son serial killers (played by Sid Haig as Judah Lazarus and Joe Knetter as Obediah Lazarus) who believe God has sent them the commandment to kill anyone who would harm Jews or Jews whom fail to properly practice their faith. Horrifyingly, after the psychotic killer hunts and kills his victim, he leaves behind a Star of David inscription in the body of his dead victims. The killer lights another candle in the menorah for each kill he makes in this "Festival of Frights". The film is one of the few Jewish horror films and is probably the first Hanukkah horror film, making it a notable entry in the horror genre.

 Double Holiday Double Holiday is a 2019 romantic comedy directed by Don McBrearty and written by Nina Weinman. The hard-nosed managing partner of Manhattan-based Bennett and Swanson Property Developers, Jane Bennett, struggles in the short term to reassign the responsibilities of her former VP. The leading candidates to fill the VP position are her senior project-managers, Carly Pope as Rebecca Hoffman and Kristoffer Polaha asChris Coulter, who both want the promotion. Jane assigns them to organize the company Christmas party at Jane's home in one week to sway the potential client in order to determine which, if either, of them will get the promotion. In the process Chris and Rebecca's personal and professional relationship emerges as they explore each other's Hanukkah and Christmas traditions.

 An American Pickle An American Pickle is a 2020 American comedy-drama film directed by Brandon Trost (in his solo directorial debut) and written by Simon Rich, based on his 2013 short story "Sell Out". The film stars Seth Rogen as an Eastern European Jewish immigrant Herschel Greenbaum who gets preserved in a vat of pickles and wakes up a century later in modern-day New York City, attempting to fit in with the assistance of his last remaining descendant Ben Greenbaum (also played by Rogen). Although neither of the Greenbaums celebrate Hanukkah in the film, the film centers around issues important to many Ashkenazi immigrants who came from Eastern Europe at the turn of the 20th century which lends the film to a Hanukkah celebration. Originally intended to be released by Sony Pictures, the film's rights were sold to Warner Bros. in April 2020. It was digitally released in the United States on August 6, 2020, the first original film released by HBO Max, and theatrically in the United Kingdom the following day. The film received mixed to positive reviews from critics, with Rogen's dual performance being praised.

 Love, Lights, Hanukkah! Love, Lights, Hanukkah!  is a 2020 Hallmark romantic comedy directed by Mark Jean and written by Karen Berger. Christina Rossi (played by Mia Kirshner) takes a DNA test that reveals that she is unexpectedly 50% Jewish. Eager to learn about her Jewish culture, Christina meets her birth mother Ruth Berman (played by Marilu Henner) and discovers the joys of latkes, menorahs, and kugel and an unexpected romance with David Singer (played by Ben Savage). The film was acknowledged by Insider as Hallmark's first genuine Hanukkah film.

 Notable examples of films referencing Hanukkah 

 Futurama: Bender's Big Score Futurama: Bender's Big Score (or Bender's Big Score) is a 2007 American direct-to-video animated science fiction comedy-adventure film based on the animated series Futurama. The film incorporates other holidays, but features an original character named the "Chanukah Zombie"'' played by Mark Hamill (known for his role as Luke Skywalker).

See also 
Hanukkah in television
Hanukkah

References 

 
Hanukkah fiction
Film genres
Films about Jews and Judaism